Institute of Experimental Medicine, Academy of Sciences of the Czech Republic (IEM)  is focused on biomedical research, incl. cell biology,  neuropathology, teratology, cancer research, molecular embryology, stem cells and nervous tissue regeneration as such leading institution in the research in the CR it was selected as an EU Center of Excellence (MEDIPRA). IEM is member of Network of European Neuroscience Institutes (ENI-NET).

Departments

Auditory Neuroscience 
Laboratory of Auditory Physiology and Pathology, Laboratory of Synaptic Physiology

Genetic Ecotoxicology 
Laboratory of Molecular Epidemiology, Laboratory of Genetic Toxicology, Laboratory of Genomics

Teratology 
Laboratory of Embryogenesis, Laboratory of Odontogenesis

Molecular Biology of Cancer
Laboratory of the Genetics of Cancer, Laboratory of DNA Repair

Transplantation Immunology 
Laboratory of Eye Histochemistry and Pharmacology

Neuroscience 
Laboratory of Diffusion Studies and Imaging Methods, Laboratory of Tissue Culture and Stem Cells, Laboratory of biomaterials and biophysical methods)

Other departments
Dep. of Cellular Neurophysiology, Molecular Neurophysiology, Functional Organization of Biomembranes, Pharmacology, Tissue Engineering

References

External links

 

Nanomedicine
Neuroscience research centers in the Czech Republic
Cancer organizations
Czech Academy of Sciences
1975 establishments in Czechoslovakia
Research institutes established in 1975
Medical research institutes in the Czech Republic